Harriet Austin (born 14 May 1988) is a New Zealand rower from Whanganui.

She represented New Zealand in the women's eights in the 2010 World Rowing Championships at Lake Karapiro, and again in the 2010 World Rowing Cup at Rotsee, Lucerne, Switzerland.

She rowed in the number 6 seat, and was captain, for the Oxford women's crew in the 2017 Boat Race while studying for an MBA at Christ Church, University of Oxford.

References

1988 births
Living people
New Zealand female rowers
Alumni of Christ Church, Oxford
Rowers from Whanganui
21st-century New Zealand women